Danacord is a Danish classical music record label founded in 1979 in Copenhagen by Jesper Buhl. Danacord has made many premiere recordings of lesser known Danish music. Danacord has also re-released historical recordings such as the survey by Kai Laursen (1924-1996) survey for Danish Radio of 26 Danish violin concertos, covering 200 years, in 10 volumes.

References

External links
 About Danacord

Classical music record labels